Plateosauridae is a family of plateosaurian sauropodomorphs from the Late Triassic of Europe, Greenland, Africa and Asia. Although several dinosaurs have been classified as plateosaurids over the years, the family Plateosauridae is now restricted to Plateosaurus, Yimenosaurus, Euskelosaurus, and Issi. In another study, Yates (2003) sunk Sellosaurus into Plateosaurus (as P. gracilis).

Classification
Plateosauridae, which was first named by Othniel Charles Marsh in 1895, is a stem-based taxon and it was defined by Sereno, 1998 as all animals more closely related to Plateosaurus engelhardti than to Massospondylus carinatus. Galton and Upchurch, 2004 proposed the following definition: all animals more closely related to Plateosaurus engelhardti than to Massospondylus carinatus and Yunnanosaurus huangi. Yates, 2007 defined it as all animals more closely related to Plateosaurus engelhardti than to Diplodocus longus. Recent cladistic analyses suggest that the clade Prosauropoda, which was named by Huene in 1920 and was defined by Sereno, 1998 as all animals more closely related to Plateosaurus engelhardti than to Saltasaurus loricatus, is a synonym of Plateosauridae as both contain the same taxa. Plateosauridae was recovered as a monophyletic group in the large phylogenetic analysis of early dinosaurs that was presented by Baron, Norman & Barrett (2017) in the journal Nature. In this analysis, the group was found to be sister to Massopoda within the clade Plateosauria. In 2021 a study that named a new species, Issi saaneq, recovered this species as the sister taxon of Plateosaurus.

References

External links
 Plateosauridae at Palaeos.com

 
Plateosauria
Norian first appearances
Rhaetian extinctions
Taxa named by Othniel Charles Marsh
Prehistoric dinosaur families